Macbridea  is a small genus of plants in the family Lamiaceae, first described in 1818. It is native to the southeastern United States.

Species
 Macbridea alba Chapm. - Florida
 Macbridea caroliniana (Walter) S.F.Blake - Alabama, Georgia, Florida, North + South Carolina

References

Lamiaceae
Lamiaceae genera
Flora of the Southeastern United States